Wang Zhongcheng (December 20, 1925 – September 30, 2012) was a Chinese surgeon, and author of many literature which greatly popularized cerebral angiography and microneurosurgery techniques in mainland China.

Wang was a native of Yantai. He began as a general surgeon, but soon turned to neurosurgery. He served as President of Xuwu Hospital, Director of the Beijing Neurosurgical Institute and President of Beijing Tiantan Hospital. He performed more than 10,000 operations over his career.

He was selected as an academician of Chinese Academy of Engineering in 1994, and was awarded the Highest Science and Technology Award of 2008.

References

External links
Wang Zhongcheng's obituary 

1925 births
2012 deaths
Physicians from Shandong
People from Yantai
Peking University alumni
Chinese surgeons
Members of the Chinese Academy of Engineering
People of the Republic of China